Despot S. Badžović (1850 — 30 November 1930) was a teacher and an activist of the Serbian national movement in Macedonia. Badžović was also one of the early Macedonists, who developed some kind of pro-Serbian Slav Macedonian identity.

Teacher in Kruševo 

Despot Badžović and his brother Đorđe graduated at the Second Department of the Belgrade Orthodox Seminary founded by Miloš Milojević. In 1871 Badžović opened a Serbian school in Kruševo for about 60 students where he and his brother Đorđe were the first teachers. Đorđe left the school in 1875 to become a teacher in Smilevo, and Despot left in 1876 to live in Serbia. Their brother Kuzman and his wife, Jelena Badžović, replaced them as teachers.

Move to Serbia 

During the Serbian-Ottoman War Badžović distinguished himself by mobilizing volunteers who illegally crossed the Ottoman-Serbian border to join Serbian forces and as a company commander. After the war ended in February 1877, Despot became a scribe in the Pčinja District.

On 20 May 1877 Badžović was in the delegation of “Serbs of Old Serbia" who asked the government of Serbia to liberate and unite Old Serbia with the Principality of Serbia. They also informed representatives of the Great Powers and the Emperor of Russia of their demands. In the same year Badžović became a member of the Committee for the Liberation of Old Serbia and Macedonia.

On 20 May 1879 Badžović suggested to the Serbian Ministry of Internal Affairs that Serbian forces should enter Macedonia to incite rebellion against the Ottomans.

Primers 
At the end of 1879, with approval of Matija Ban, Badžović published the 'Alphabet Textook for Serbo-Macedonian Primary Schools' written on "Serbo-Macedonian dialect". Matija Ban proposed to the government of the Principality of Serbia to establish the Main Board with eight members who would maintain the connection with smaller sub boards in smaller places in the Old Serbia and Macedonia. Minister of Education Vladan Đorđević engaged Badžović to participate in composing of the alphabet book for the Serbian Schools in Macedonia. He adapted his earlier alphabet book and sent it to the Ministry of Education of Serbia under a new name 'Alphabet book for Macedonian Schools in Turkish Empire'.

Notable works 
 
 
 
 Македонско Питање, Предлог за споразум« измсђу Срба, Грка и Бугара о Савезу балканских народа - В. Градиште, шт. Штампарија Ане М. Драшхоција, 1893

See also 
 Association of Serbo-Macedonians

References

1850 births
1930 deaths
People from Kruševo
Serbian nationalists
Serbian activists
Serbian educators
Early Macedonists
19th-century Serbian people
20th-century Serbian people
People of the Kingdom of Yugoslavia
People of the Macedonian Struggle
Serbian–Turkish Wars (1876–1878)